Cakung Station (CUK) is a class II railway station in Pulogebang, Cakung, East Jakarta. The station, which is located at an altitude of +18 m, is included in the Jakarta Operational Area I and only serves the KRL Commuterline route. The station has a total of six railway tracks.

The station straddles the border of Jakarta and West Java, even the south and east sides after being extended are administratively located in Bintara, West Bekasi, Bekasi, West Java. Despite this, the station's entrance still lies within the borders of Jakarta, and therefore is stated as part of Jakarta. Cakung is the easternmost station in Jakarta. This station is also a busy station with a very large number of passengers in the morning and evening during rush hour.

To the east of this station, before Kranji Station, there is the former Rawabebek Station location which is no longer active due to minimal occupancy.

Building and layout 

Initially, the station had four railway lines with lines 2 and 3 being straight tracks. After the Jatinegara–Cakung quadruple-track railway section was officially operated in 2019, the number of lines has increased to six with lines 5 and 6 being new straight tracks specifically for non-KRL trains. Lines 5 and 6 are equipped with a quadruple-track railway end switch on the east side of the station embankment. Then, after the Cakung–Bekasi quadruple-track railway section was officially operated on mid-December 2022, the railroad switch was completely dismantled so that now the two lines are straight lines without being connected with railroad switch at all.

Since 9 October 2018, this station has used a new building with a futuristic minimalist modern architecture which is located a little to the east of the old building. The relocation did not change the layout of the railway track at all.

In 2021, an overpass was built next to 6 railway tracks near Cakung Station to replace a level crossing which has been permanently closed. The currently closed level crossing was a connector between the I Gusti Ngurah Rai street at the south of the Cakung Station and the Pulo Gebang Raya street, that connects the station to Penggilingan which already exist since 1902.

Services
The following is a list of train services at the Cakung Station.

Passenger services 
 KAI Commuter
  Cikarang Loop Line (Full Racket)
  Cikarang Loop Line (Half Racket), to / (via  and ) and

Supporting transportation

References

External links 
 

East Jakarta
Railway stations in Jakarta